King George's War (1744–1748) is the name given to the military operations in North America that formed part of the War of the Austrian Succession (1740–1748). It was the third of the four French and Indian Wars.  It took place primarily in the British provinces of New York, Massachusetts Bay (which included Maine as well as Massachusetts at the time), New Hampshire (which included Vermont at the time), and Nova Scotia. Its most significant action was an expedition organized by Massachusetts Governor William Shirley that besieged and ultimately captured the French fortress of Louisbourg, on Cape Breton Island in Nova Scotia, in 1745. In French, it is known as the Troisième Guerre Intercoloniale or Third Intercolonial War.

The Treaty of Aix-la-Chapelle ended the war in 1748 and restored Louisbourg to France, but failed to resolve any outstanding territorial issues.

Causes

The War of Jenkins' Ear (named for a 1731 incident in which a Spanish commander sliced off the ear of British merchant captain Robert Jenkins and told him to take it to his king, George II) broke out in 1739 between Spain and Great Britain, but was restrained to the Caribbean Sea and conflict between Spanish Florida and the neighboring British Province of Georgia.  The War of the Austrian Succession, nominally a struggle over the legitimacy of the accession of Maria Theresa to the Austrian throne, began in 1740, but at first did not involve either Britain or Spain militarily. Britain was drawn diplomatically into that conflict in 1742 as an ally of Austria and an opponent of France and Prussia, but open hostilities between them did not take place until 1743 at Dettingen.

War was not formally declared between Britain and France until March 1744. Massachusetts did not declare war against Quebec and France until June 2.

Course of the war

News of war declarations reached the French fortress at Louisbourg first, on May 3, 1744, and the forces there wasted little time in beginning hostilities. Concerned about their overland supply lines to Quebec, they raided the British fishing port of Canso on May 23, and then organized an attack on Annapolis Royal, the capital of Nova Scotia. But French forces were delayed in departing Louisbourg, and their Mi'kmaq and Maliseet First Nations allies, together with Father Jean-Louis Le Loutre, decided to attack on their own at Fort Anne in early July.

Annapolis had received news of the war declaration, and the British forces were somewhat prepared when the First Nations warriors began besieging Fort Anne. Lacking heavy weapons, the Mi'kmaq and Maliseet withdrew after a few days. Then, in mid-August, a larger French force arrived at Fort Anne, but it was also unable to mount an effective attack or siege against the garrison. The fort had received supplies and reinforcements from Massachusetts.

In 1745, British colonial forces captured Fortress Louisbourg after a siege of six weeks. In retaliation, the Wabanaki Confederacy of Acadia launched the Northeast Coast Campaign (1745) against the British settlements on the border of Acadia in northeast Maine. France launched a major expedition to recover Louisbourg in 1746. Beset by storms, disease, and finally the death of its commander, the Duc d'Anville, the expedition's survivors returned to France in tatters without reaching its objective.

The war was also fought on the frontiers between the northern British colonies and New France. Each side had allies among the Native Americans, and outlying villages were raided and captives taken for ransom, or sometimes adoption by Native American tribes who had suffered losses to disease or warfare. As a result of the frequent raiding on the northern frontier, Governor William Shirley ordered the construction of a chain of frontier outposts stretching west to its border with New York.

On November 28, 1745, the French with their Indian allies raided and destroyed the village of Saratoga, New York, killing or capturing more than one hundred of its inhabitants. After this, the British abandoned their settlements in New York north of Albany, a major trading city. In July 1746 an Iroquois and intercolonial force assembled in northern New York for a retaliatory attack against British forces.

When the expected British regulars never arrived, the attack was called off. A large (1,000+ man) French and First Nations force mustered to raid in the upper Hudson River valley in 1746 instead raided in the Hoosac River valley, including an attack on Fort Massachusetts (at present-day North Adams, Massachusetts). This was in retaliation for the slaying of an Indian leader in an earlier skirmish. Other raids included the 1747 French and Mi'kmaq raid on Grand Pré, Nova Scotia; and a raid in 1748 by Indian allies of the French against Schenectady, New York.

Aftermath

The war took a heavy toll, especially in the northern British colonies. The losses of Massachusetts men alone in 1745–46 have been estimated as 8% of that colony's adult male population.

According to the Treaty of Aix-la-Chapelle, Louisbourg was returned to France three years later, in exchange for the city of Madras in India, which had been captured by the French from the British. This decision outraged New Englanders, particularly Massachusetts colonists who had contributed the most to the expedition (in terms of funding and personnel). The British government eventually acknowledged Massachusetts' effort with a payment of £180,000 after the war. The province used this money to retire its devalued paper currency.

The peace treaty, which restored all colonial borders to their pre-war status, did little to end the lingering enmity between France, Britain, and their respective colonies, nor did it resolve any territorial disputes. Tensions remained in both North America and Europe. They broke out again in 1754, with the start of the French and Indian War in North America, which spread to Europe two years later as the Seven Years' War. Between 1749 and 1755 in Acadia and Nova Scotia, the fighting continued in Father Le Loutre's War.

See also
 American Indian Wars
 Colonial American military history
 Military history of Canada
 Military history of the Mi'kmaq people
 Military history of Nova Scotia
 Military history of the Acadians
 Military of New France

References

Further reading
Boyer, Clark, Kett, Salisbury, Sitkoff and Woloch. The Enduring Vision: A History of the American People
Drake, Samuel Gardner. A Particular History of the Five Years French and Indian War in New England
Kingsford, William.  The history of Canada, Volume 3
 
Peckham, Harry H. The Colonial Wars, 1689–1762

External links

King George's War on U-S-History.com
Select Bibliography of King George's War compiled by the United States Army Center of Military History
 Journal of Captain William Pote captive 1745–1747 published 1896

 
Military history of Acadia
Military history of Nova Scotia
Military history of New England
Military history of the Thirteen Colonies
Wars involving Canada
Wars involving France
Wars involving Great Britain
Wars involving the indigenous peoples of North America
War of the Austrian Succession
1740s conflicts
Conflicts in Canada
New France
Conflicts in Nova Scotia
Colonial American and Indian wars
Military history of Quebec
Acadian history
Pre-statehood history of Massachusetts
Pre-statehood history of New York (state)
Pre-statehood history of New Hampshire
Pre-statehood history of Maine
1740s in North America
1744 in North America
1745 in North America
1746 in North America
1747 in North America
1748 in North America
Colonial United States (British)
Colonial United States (French)
Colonization history of the United States
Wabanaki Confederacy
Indigenous conflicts in Canada
Wars of succession involving the states and peoples of Europe
Wars of succession involving the states and peoples of North America